NDHS may refer to:
 Narkeldanga High School, Kolkata, India
 National Disaster Housing Strategy
 New Dorp High School, New York City, United States
 North Davidson High School, Welcome, North Carolina, United States
 North Division High School (Milwaukee), Wisconsin, United States
 North Dorchester High School, Hurlock, Maryland, United States
 Norwood District High School, Norwood, Ontario, Canada
 Notre Dame High School (disambiguation)